Buckeye High School may refer to:

Buckeye High School (Louisiana) - Buckeye, Louisiana
Buckeye High School (Ohio) - York Township, Ohio
Buckeye Union High School in Buckeye, Arizona (sometimes, the Union is omitted)